Motang is a highly endangered Lolo-Burmese language with six speakers in Longtan 龙潭 village, Heizhiguo Township 黑支果乡, Guangnan County, Yunnan, China. It is spoken in only one village. Motang and Mauphu are closely related languages.

References

Mondzish languages
Languages of China